The Hall–Rabushka flat tax is a flat tax proposal on consumption designed by American economists Robert Hall and Alvin Rabushka at the Hoover Institution. The Hall–Rabushka flat tax involves taxing income but excluding investment. The Hall–Rabushka flat tax may include an exemption, which allows the tax to preserve progressivity.

In the United States, extensive tax reform has not taken place since the Tax Reform Act of 1986, and like other tax reform, the flat tax has not advanced far in the US political process.  However, Eastern Bloc countries have generally embraced the flat tax after the fall of the Iron Curtain. Hall and Rabushka have consulted extensively in designing flat taxes.

Carly Fiorina threw her public support in 2015 behind a 3-page tax plan that is largely based on this tax plan. CNN Money believes that Fiorina's plan will include a 19% flat tax for individuals and businesses' operating incomes.

See also

References

Tax reform